Danny O'Brien (born 12 March 1996) is an English professional footballer who plays as a midfielder for Skelmersdale United.

Club career
O'Brien started his career at Aston Villa where he made the bench on several occasions as the youth side won the NextGen Series in 2013. He then joined Wigan Athletic where he had loan spells at Wrexham and Chester. On 9 August 2016, he made his senior debut for Wigan in the EFL Cup as an 87th minute substitute in a 2–1 loss to Oldham Athletic.
In April 2017, O'Brien joined Finnish third-tier club Kraft. 
In February 2018, O'Brien joined Veikkausliiga side SJK, initially to play for their U23 side, SJK Akatemia. On 3 May 2018, O'Brien made his debut for SJK's senior side as a 79th minute substitute in a 3–1 loss to KuPS. On 30 November 2018, O'Brien joined National League North side Alfreton Town on a deal until the end of the season.

On 1 June 2019, O'Brien signed for fellow National League North side Curzon Ashton. However, before making an appearance for Curzon, O'Brien joined Northern Premier League side Hyde United. On 11 October 2019, after six appearances with Hyde, O'Brien joined fellow Northern Premier League side Atherton Collieries.

International career
O'Brien has played for England U17s.

References

External links

Profile at Finnish FA
Hyde United stats

Living people
1996 births
English footballers
England youth international footballers
English people of Irish descent
Wigan Athletic F.C. players
Wrexham A.F.C. players
Chester F.C. players
Association football midfielders
Kakkonen players
Veikkausliiga players
Seinäjoen Jalkapallokerho players
SJK Akatemia players
English expatriate footballers
English expatriate sportspeople in Finland
Hyde United F.C. players
Alfreton Town F.C. players
Atherton Collieries A.F.C. players
Curzon Ashton F.C. players